The 2014 U.S. Men's Clay Court Championships (also known as the Fayez Sarofim & Co. U.S. Men's Clay Court Championships for sponsorship purposes) is a tennis tournament played on outdoor clay courts. It is part of the 2014 ATP World Tour. It is the 46th edition of the U.S. Men's Clay Court Championships, and an ATP World Tour 250 event. It will take place at River Oaks Country Club in Houston, Texas, United States, from April 7 through April 13, 2014.

Singles main draw entrants

Seeds

Rankings are as of March 31, 2014.

Other entrants
The following players received wildcards into the main draw:
  Marcos Baghdatis 
  Steve Johnson 
  Rhyne Williams

The following players received entry via the qualifying draw:
  Robby Ginepri
  Ryan Harrison
  Peter Polansky 
  Rubén Ramírez Hidalgo

Withdrawals
Before the tournament
  Pablo Cuevas
  Alejandro Falla
  Bradley Klahn
  Janko Tipsarević (foot injury)
During the tournament
  Sam Querrey

Retirements
  Feliciano López (illness)

Doubles main draw entrants

Seeds

 Rankings are as of March 31, 2014.

Other entrants
The following pair received wildcards into the doubles main draw:
  Steve Johnson /  Sam Querrey
The following pair received entry as alternates:
  Thiemo de Bakker /  Melle van Gemerden

Withdrawals
Before the tournament
  Ryan Harrison (back injury)

Finals

Singles

  Fernando Verdasco defeated  Nicolás Almagro, 6–3, 7–6(7–4)

Doubles

  Bob Bryan /  Mike Bryan defeated  David Marrero /  Fernando Verdasco, 4–6, 6–4, [11–9]

References

External links

Official website